Bernie Taupin is an English lyricist, poet, and singer. In his long-term collaboration with Elton John, he has written the lyrics for most of John's songs.  Over the years, he has written songs for a variety of other artists, including Alice Cooper, Heart, Melissa Manchester, Starship, Rod Stewart and Richie Sambora.

Taupin and John began writing together in 1967 and, aside from brief periods apart working on other projects, the two have been collaborating ever since.  Their newest album, Wonderful Crazy Night, was released in early 2016.

Taupin has also released three solo albums and was a member of the short-lived group Farm Dogs, which released two albums in the mid-late 1990s.

List of songs

This is a list of titles whose lyrics Bernie Taupin has written or co-written.

Big Picture b-sides
Immigrant Sons

Other Songs

10 Soldater
12
1965
A Little Peace
A Love That Will Never Grow Old
A Minute of Your Life
A New Clear Morning
Accents
Across the River Thames
Act of War
Adult Music
Aftermath
Ain't We Bad in the Big City
All I Want to do is Make Love to You
All Or Nothing
All That I'm Allowed (I'm Thankful)
American Triangle
An Angel's Wing
And the House Fell Down
Anitta
Answer in the Sky
Are You Alright?
Bad News Baby Darling
Ball
Ballad of the Boy in Red Shoes
Bed of Nails
Birds
Black Cat Crossing the Road
Black on Blue
Blood in the Dust
Blues Never Fade Away
Bobbie on the Backburner
Bobby Goes Electric
Bonnie's Gone Away
Bring Back the Magic
Building a Bird
But Then Again
Calling it Christmas
Caminaga Ella Tan Linda
Cherokee D.J
Child
Chiquita
Cowboy
Cry Willow Cry
Culture Shock/Counter Clock
Damn My Eyes
Dance With Life (The Brilliant Light)
Dark Diamond
Deal for Life
Dear Ground
Destiny
Diamonds Won't Do it (But I Will)
Did Anybody Sleep with Joan of Arc?
Don't Be the Last to Know
Du Far Ej Fa
Du Far Ej Ga
Dub Till You Drop
Dup Songs
Emery Green
En Sorgsen Sang
First Verse
Freaks in Love
Free to Believe
Giardino Dell 'Amore
Gimme Eight Seconds
Ginseng Woman
God Never Came Here
Goin' North
Going Blind
Heart of an Angel
Heart of Glass
Hell
How Long Lord (Before the Night Is Over?)
How's Tomorrow?
Hungry Eyes
I Am Not the Enemy
I Am the Hunter
I Came to Dance
I Can't Keep This From You
I Have Slipped
I Hypnotise
I Must Have Lost It on the Wind
I Stop and I Breathe
I Want Love
If I Was a Country
I'm a Working Man
I'm Not the Enemy
In the Name of Dark Angels
It's Getting Dark in Here
It's Me that You Need
It's Only Rain
It's Your Game
Jazz Girl
Jealousy Regrets
Josephine
Just Like Noah's Ark
Keep It a Mystery
Keep Me
Le Dernier Mot
Leaves
Leaving at Midnight
Leaving the Fair
Light in Your Heart
Little Casanova
Little Quick Draw
Llora Al Cielo
Long-Legged Women
Look At What We've Done
Look Ma No Hands
Love
Love and Greed
Love Cuts Like a Dangerous Blade
Love Her Like Me
Love Touch
Lovers Leap
Lullaby
Make Me As You Are
Mansfield
Manslide
Mendocino County Line
Mexicana Fire
(Midnight) Midlife Crisis
Minha Vida Sem Voce
Misfits
Monkey in My Dreams
Monkeys in the Jungle
Muniquita
My Elusive Drug
My Side of the River
New Morning
Nona Gita
Non-Existente
Nothin' Left But Ashes (After the Fire Has Gone Out)
Old '67
On This Rock
Onetime, Sometime Or Never
Only a Boy
Original Sin
Out of My Hands
Pandora's Swing
Pay Dirt
Pearl River
Peter's Song
Photograph of Mary
Porch Swing in Tupelo
Postcards from Richard Nixon
Prime of My Life
Promiscuous Man
Proof of Paradise
Quantrill
Quelques Mots Essentiels
Reach Out
Ridin' Free
Rosa
Rough Justice
Rubber Guns
Rusted Love
Sail Me Away
Savannah
Seven-Four-Seven
Sexy on the Inside
Shadows in Charge
Shane
Show Us Your Ghosts
Sign in the Clouds
Sign of the Cross
Skin
Sleeping Through the Weekend
Slice of Life
Slow the Dogs Down
Slumber City
Slummin'
Sneakin' Out the Backway
So Jenny Rocks
So Much Love
So Sad the Renegade
Somebody Special
Sorrow Is Not For Me
Stallion Road
Storm Days
Strength of His Kiss
Sugar and Fire
Switchblade Years
Talk About You
Thank You For All of Your Loving
The Ace of Hearts and the Jack of Spades
The Bridge
The Captain and the Kid
The Crack in the Sky
The Eastern Bloc
The Emperor's New Clothes
The Heart of an Angel
The Heart of Every Girl
The Kids Are Loose
The Last Motel
The Last Ride of Charlie Fury
The North Star
The Price of Lightning
The Rage
The Wasteland
They Call Her the Cat
Thin Ice of Love
Things Only Get Better with Love
This Train Don't Stop There Anymore
Tinderbox
To a Grandfather
To Die With My Boots On
Toni Loved the Rain
Too Many Tears
Touch the Fire
Turn the Lights Out When You Leave
Two-Armed Bandit
Una Fletcha Mots
Uncool (written with and performed by Courtney Love)
Union Jack
Until You Come Back to Me
Up Up (Over the Berlin Wall)
Waitress in a Roadhouse
Water Kill Fire
We Are Romantics (R.U.1.2)
We Need Us
We've Landed
Weight of the World
Welcome to the Haunted Heart
What I Really Want for Christmas
When Love Survives
Witches (Get Burned)
Wouldn't Have You Any Other Way (NYC)
Wounded Knee
You Freed Me
Young Lust

References

Taupin